Heart Yorkshire in Barnsley, Huddersfield Leeds, Doncaster and the surrounding areas
 Heart South Wales in Fishguard
 Heart London in London and the surrounding areas